Lluís Maria Xirinacs i Damians (6 August 1932 – 11 August 2007) was a Catalan politician, writer, catholic cleric and advocate for the independence of Catalonia.

Biography
He was born in Barcelona in 1932, and he became a priest when he was 22.  In 1990 he abandoned the priesthood.

In the 1960s and 1970s, he conducted several hunger strikes, the first a long one against the relationship between church and state in Francoist Spain. He was imprisoned twice (1972 and 1974–75). He declared himself a follower of Gandhi's ideals and employed non-violence in his struggles. For example, he spent twelve hours a day for a year and nine months standing in front of a Barcelona prison until the approval of an amnesty law for political prisoners. As a result of all these actions, he was nominated for the Nobel Peace Prize every year from 1975 to 1977.

In 1977, in the first Spanish elections after the end of Francoist Spain, he became senator for Barcelona as an independent candidate. In 1979, he was a candidate for the Spanish Congress of Deputies in a coalition known as Left Bloc of National Freedom (Bloc d'Esquerra d'Alliberament Nacional or BEAN). This reinvigorated the spirit of the former Assembly of Catalonia, of which he also was one of the main promoters. Later on, BEAN presented candidates in the 1980 Catalan Parliament elections; but, in both cases, it did not obtain any representation.

«Fundació Tercera Via" (Third-Way Foundation), currently "Fundació Randa-Lluís M. Xirinacs" (Randa-Lluís Maria Xirinacs Foundation) was founded on 27 October 1987, by Xirinacs and a group of his friends.

By 1980, he left active party politics. In 1984, along with Agustí Chalaux, he founded the Centre d'Estudis Joan Bardina, where he wanted to explore deeper into a new economical, political and social model.

In 1990 he abandoned his priesthood vows. In 2000, he started to protest again, sitting in Plaça Sant Jaume daily for the independence of the Catalan Countries.

When he was 65, he was awarded a PhD in philosophy.

In 2005 he was sentenced to 2 years in prison for glorifying terrorism.

Trial
On 11 September 2002, within the National Day of Catalonia reivindicative speeches in Fossar de les Moreres, he declared:

After this, Xirinacs was sentenced to two years of prison and four years of incapacitation by the Spanish Audiencia Nacional, accused of ennobling terrorism.

On 17 December 2002, he stated to the jury in his defence:

"No crec que sigui delicte fer feina d'historiador (de la qual es pot discrepar): -de descriure una guerra d'alliberament nacional que dura ja quaranta anys, -i de comparar-la amb altres guerres.»
"I don't think that working as a historian (with whom one may disagree) is any crime: -describing a war for national freedom that has lasted now for 40 years, -and comparing it with other wars."

And he also added:
«Són els tancs espanyols que ocupen el País Basc. Cap arma basca no vol conquerir Espanya.»
"It is the Spanish tanks that are occupying the Basque Country. No Basque weapon wants to conquer Spain".

Madrid's National Court tried him in absentia (Xirinacs failed to appear) and sentenced him to two years in prison for glorifying terrorism. On 25 October 2005, when he was 74, he was arrested by Spanish Police when he visited Ciutat Vella commissary in order to renew his identity document. Two days later, he was sent to prison, but in the very same afternoon, the Attorney General decided to free him, invoking humanitarian reasons due to his age.

In 2004, Catalan Summer University awarded him the Canigó prize. During that time, he continued his political commitment within Fundació Randa.

Randa-Lluís Maria Xirinacs Foundation is continuing his legacy and tries to disseminate Xirinacs proposals for personal and collective liberation, which include a philosophical model: Globàlium, short model and great model.

Death
On 11 August 2007, he was found dead in the woods Ogassa, Ripollès, having committed suicide according to some sources., even if the autopsy confirmed it was not. He left a note in his workplace explaining his decision, where he criticized the cowardice of Catalan politicians:

Act of sovereignty

I have lived 75 years in the Catalan Countriesoccupied by Spain, France – and Italy- for centuriesfighting against this slavery during all of my adult life.A slave nation, a slave human being,shame for Humanity and the Universe.But a Nation will never be freeif her sons do not want to risktheir lives in her defence and liberation.My friends, accept this final victorious endof my combat  to stress  the fearfulnessof our leaders, who make masses out of People.Today, my Nation becomes absolute sovereign in me.They have lost a slaveshe is a little more freebecause I am in you, my friends!Lluís M. Xirinacs i Damians, Barcelona, August 6, 2007News about the death, at the Avui

Discography 
 Carlo Forlivesi, En la Soledat i el Silenci (2007–2008), a musical composition in three movements for koto and guitar. The title "En la Soledat i el Silenci" (In Solitude and in Silence) is a quotation from the last writing of Lluís Maria Xirinacs. The piece is included in the CD album Silenziosa Luna – 沈黙の月 (ALCD 76).

See also
 List of peace activists

References

1932 births
2007 deaths
Politicians from Barcelona
Members of the Senate of Spain
Spanish politicians who committed suicide
Suicides in Spain
Hunger strikers